Right Rhythm is the fourteenth studio album by the Pointer Sisters, released on June 12, 1990 by the Motown label.

History
In 1978, the Pointer Sisters had begun an eleven-year association with Richard Perry - first through his Planet Records label and then still working with Perry with RCA Records - with the group amassing a total of eleven Top 40 hits. The Pointer Sisters' 1984 multi-platinum album release, Break Out was parent to four Top Ten hits including "I'm So Excited" introduced on the 1982 So Excited! album but remixed and added to later pressings of 1983 Break Out. The career climax achieved there was followed by a decline in popularity and in 1988 the Pointer Sisters ended their contract with RCA.

It was reported in March 1989 that the Pointer Sisters were negotiating with Motown Records. The label passed on the group when they'd sought their first record deal in 1971, though sister and original member Bonnie Pointer left the group for a solo career with Motown from 1977-1981. The group signed with Motown in May 1989 with member June Pointer then stating: "We want to help Motown get back up where it was" referencing the label's own faded fortunes.

Motown did not prove to be the label that would recharge the Pointer Sister's career. The label released the groups' Right Rhythm album in the summer of 1990 following the May 1990 issue of the advance single "Friends' Advice"; that single was a relative failure, only reaching #36 on the Billboard R&B charts. The second single, a ballad called "After You", also failed to find a widespread audience. A third single, a remixed version of the album's "Insanity", managed a #62 R&B peak (#11 on the Billboard dance charts). Right Rhythm would be the only album release by the Pointer Sisters on Motown.

The Right Rhythm track "Billy Said Yes" featured background vocals by Issa Pointer, the daughter of Ruth Pointer: Issa Pointer would replace June Pointer in the group's membership in 2002.

Track listing
 "Friends' Advice (Don't Take It)" (Donald Robinson, Tina Harris) - 4:04
 "Man With the Right Rhythm" (Anita Pointer, Charles Kelly) - 4:51
 "Real Life" (Kurt Farquhar, Paul Chiten) - 4:09
 "After You" (Deborah Thomas, Terry Shaddick) - 4:30
 "You Knocked the Love (Right Outta My Heart)" (Fritz Cadet, Millie Jackson, Timmy Allen) - 4:47
 "Billy Said Yes" (Brenda Blonski, John Patterson, Morris "Butch" Stewart) - 3:49
 "Insanity" (Danny Sembello, Marti Sharron) - 3:57
 "What a Woman Wants" (Henry Gaffney) - 4:21
 "Where Have You Been?" (Anita Pointer, David Harvey, June Pointer, Sami McKinney) - 4:55
 "(We Just Wanna) Thank You" - 3:25

Personnel 

The Pointer Sisters
 Anita Pointer – vocals
 June Pointer – vocals
 Ruth Pointer – vocals

Musicians
 Levi Seacer, Jr. – all instruments (1, 2, 3, 5, 6, 10), rhythm arrangements (2)
 John Barnes – keyboards (4, 8), synthesizers (4, 8, 9)
 James Anthony Carmichael – keyboards (4, 8, 9)
 Lloyd Tolbert – keyboards (4, 8, 9)
 Khris Kellow – keyboards (7)
 Ralph Hawkins – synth solo (7)
 Steve Lindsey – keyboards (7), arrangements (7)
 Orpheus – keyboard and drum programming (7)
 Danny Sembello – keyboard programming (7), arrangements (7)
 Marti Shannon – keyboards (7), arrangements (7)
 Robbie Buchanan – additional synthesizers (8)
 Paul Jackson Jr. – guitar (4, 7, 8, 9)
 David Cochran – guitar (8), bass (8)
 Freddie Washington – bass (4, 9)
 John Robinson – drums (4, 8, 9)
 Paulinho da Costa – percussion (4, 8, 9)
 Eric Leads – horns (5)
 Sheldon Reynolds – rhythm arrangements (2)
 Niki Haris – vocal arrangements (7)
 Henry Gaffney – vocal arrangements (8)
 Issa Pointer – French rap (6)

Production 
 Producers – Levi Seacer, Jr. (Tracks 1, 2, 3, 5, 6 & 10); James Anthony Carmichael (Tracks 4, 8 & 9); Marti Shannon (Track 7).
 Associate Producer on Track 7 – Danny Sembello
 Executive Producers – Debbie Sandridge and The Pointer Sisters.
 Engineers – Dave Friedlander (Tracks 1, 2, 3, 5, 6 & 10);  Calvin Harris (Tracks 4, 8 & 9); Bob Biles, Craig Burbidge, Fletcher Dobrocke and Val Garay (Track 7).
 Assistant Engineers – Craig Doubet and Tim Penn (Tracks 1, 2, 3, 5, 6 & 10); Mark Hagen (Tracks 4, 8 & 9); Eric Annest, Gregg Barrett, Lawrence Ethan, Steve Heinke, Mike Scotella, Gary Skardina and Jeff Welch (Track 7).
 Recorded at Paisley Park Studios (Chanhassen, MN); Scream Studios (Studio City, CA); Westlake Studios, Music Grinder, Studio 55, Ignition Studios and Steve Lindsey Studio (Los Angeles, CA); Cal Harris Studios (Woodland Hills, CA); Aire LA (Glendale, CA).
 Mixing – Goh Hotoda and Shep Pettibone (Track 1); Dave Friedlander and Levi Seacer, Jr. (Tracks 2, 3, 5, 6 & 10); Calvin Harris (Tracks 4, 8 & 9); Chris Lord-Alge (Track 7).
 Mixed at Axis Studios and Soundworks (New York, NY); Paisley Park Studios; Westlake Studios; The Grey Room (Los Angeles, CA).
 Mastered by Chris Bellman at Bernie Grundman Mastering (Hollywood, CA).
 Project Assistant – Gayle Woodard
 Art Direction – Stephen Meltzer
 Design – Julie Moss
 Photography – Paul Jasmin
 Management – Gallin Morey Associates

References

External links
 

1990 albums
The Pointer Sisters albums
Motown albums